Maryland's 1st congressional district encompasses the entire Eastern Shore of Maryland, including Salisbury, as well as Harford County and parts of Baltimore County; it is the largest congressional district in the state geographically, covering 11 counties (in whole or part).

The district is currently represented by Republican Andy Harris, who defeated Democratic incumbent Frank M. Kratovil Jr. in 2010. The district was the subject of a 2014 boycott following legislation Harris introduced nullifying a District of Columbia law de-criminalizing possession of marijuana. With a Cook Partisan Voting Index rating of R+11, it is the only Republican-leaning district in Maryland.

Election results from presidential races since 2008

List of members representing the district

Recent election results

2000s

2010s

2020s

See also

Maryland's congressional districts
List of United States congressional districts

Notes

References

 

01
Eastern Shore of Maryland
Constituencies established in 1789
1789 establishments in Maryland